The 2015 season was Persib Bandung's 56th season in the club football history, the 19th consecutive season in the top-flight Liga Indonesia season and the 7th season competing in the Indonesia Super League.

Review and events

Pre–2015 
Persib was invited to compete in an international friendly tournament, Marah Halim Cup 2015, from 4–14 January 2015, but declined it on 9 December 2014. They began their first training for the 2015 Indonesia Super League on 23 December 2014. They were planning to have a training center using the facilities of Inter Milan in Italy starting January 6, 2015, but due to tight schedule, the plan was cancelled. Persib stated that they will participate in the 2015 Walikota Padang Cup on 4–8 January 2015. On a 3×40 minutes friendly against local club Tiki Taka FC on 31 December 2014, Persib won 4–0 with each goal from Firman Utina, trial player Hector Eduardo Sosa, new recruit Yandi Sofyan Munawar, and Atep Rizal.

Due to winning the 2014 Indonesia Super League, Persib was given a spot on 2015 AFC Champions League. They, alongside Persipura, also received byes on the 2015 Piala Indonesia and will directly participate in the Round of 16.

Persib retained the majority of the squad. Persib released Djibril Coulibaly due to declining performance. Some players who would still play for this season are Abdul Rahman, Firman Utina, and the three goalkeepers, and some players who got new contracts are Makan Konaté, Muhammad Agung Pribadi, Vladimir Vujović, and Rudiyana. Ferdinand Sinaga left the club to join Sriwijaya F.C. Persib has currently secured three new players, which are Dedi Kusnandar, Dias Angga Putra, and Yandi Sofyan Munawar. Persib actually had gotten the signature of striker Aron da Silva, but he backed out because his old club won't release him. Strikers Michele Di Piedi and Hector Eduardo Sosa came to trial on Persib, but none of them were recruited. Meanwhile, striker Maycon Calijuri who came to trial on 30 December continued the selection.

January 
Emral Abus was signed to replace Djadjang Nurdjaman as the head coach for the AFC Champions League due to restricting requirement of the competition. Joining Maycon, strikers Nicolás Vigneri and Koh Traore came to trial on Persib. Vigneri was released on 26 January, while Maycon and Traore's fate will be determined after the 2014 Indonesian Inter Island Cup finals on 1 February. Striker Sigit Hermawan were loaned to PSGC Ciamis on a 1-season-long loan.

On the 2015 Piala Walikota Padang, Persib won the cup after defeating PSP Padang and Pusamania Borneo F.C. both 3–0 on group stage and Persiba Balikpapan 2–0 in the final. Tantan also became the top-scorer. On an international friendly against Felda United F.C. they won 3–1. They won 2–1 on another friendly against Persibat Batang. They run two friendly matches on their training center in Ciamis against Persires Kuningan and PSGC Ciamis and won both of them 3–0 and 3–1 respectively.

Three Diklat Persib players, Gian Zola, Hanif Sahbandi, and Jujun Saefuloh, were called up to Indonesia national U-16 and U-19 team selection. Persib's third goal-keeper M Natshir were called up to Indonesia national U-22 national team. Manager Umuh Muchtar became one of PT Liga Indonesia's commissioner for 2015 season due to Persib's win in the previous season.

February 
On their first official match of the season, Persib lost 4–0 against Hanoi T&T F.C. on Mỹ Đình National Stadium on the 2nd preliminary round of the 2015 AFC Champions League qualifying play-offs. Their first ISL match was supposed to be on 20 February 2015 against last year's runners-up Persipura Jayapura, before Kemenpora on 18 February decided to postpone 2015 ISL due to too many clubs that haven't completed their licensing files. On their first 2015 AFC Cup match, Persib won 4–1 in their home against Maldivian team New Radiant S.C. with Jufriyanto, Konaté, Atep, and Yandi scored each a goal.

On the 2014 Indonesian Inter Island Cup finals, Persib lost 1–2 to Arema Cronus F.C. with Vujović scored Persib's only goal. They won 5–1 on a friendly against Cilegon United F.C., with Yandi, Supardi, Tantan, Vujović, and trial player Robson da Silva scoring the goals. They run another friendly against their youth team Diklat Persib and won 3–1 with Atep, Konaté, and Jufriyanto scored the goals. They also won the following friendly against Football Plus FC on 20 February by 7–0, with Konaté scored three goals, Tantan scored two goals, and Atep and Firman scored a goal each.

The two trial strikers, Maycon and Traore, were stripped from the squad, but the statement was changed and Maycon will continue to trial because Persib is still waiting for Maycon's legal status from PT Liga Indonesia. Three more strikers came to trial on Persib on 3 and 4 February, Robson da Silva, Kim Shin-young and Carlos Raul Sciucatti. Maycon, Robson, and Carlos Raul were stripped from the trial on 7 February,  while Kim Shin-young stripped later on 13 February along with Nigerian striker Charles Parker who came on the same day. Striker Silvio Escobar came to trial on 16 February, but released on the following day. Local player Nico Malau who were invited to trial on Persib since mid-February were released on 21 February. Malian striker Ousmane Ben Goïta came to trial on 23 February 2015, but probably weren't recruited, stated by head coach Djadjang Nurdjaman. Croatian striker who were stated by the management to join Persib, Ivan Krstanović, declined and joined a European team. Cameroonian striker George Menougong came to trial on 27 February, but released on the following day.

Persib launch their team on 6 February in Siliwangi Stadium, introducing the players and 9 jerseys, three for 2015 Indonesia Super League and 2015 Piala Indonesia, two for Asian competition, two for training, and two for youth team. 2×15 minutes exhibition match also ran here by Persib against Ligina 1994/95 winners, Persib won 4–0 with two goals by Konaté and the other two by Tantan and Rudiyana. On 17 February, Persib announced Mulyana as the vice manager of the team for all competition. Persib's team doctor, Rafi Ghani, take part in ISL Medic Team training in Jakarta on 17–18 February. On 20 February, teams of 2015 ISL gathered in Bandung to state their actions against the delay of 2015 ISL as Declaration of Bandung. Persib's third goalkeeper, M Natshir, were called up to the list of 23 players of Indonesia national U-22 football team players.

March 
On their visit to Bali, they won 1–0 against Bali United Pusam F.C. with Tantan scoring the lone goal.

Finnish striker Niklas Tarvajarvi joined Persib's training while he was in Bali, but not intending to trial. Georgian striker Apollon Lemondzhava trials on Persib.

Persib's assistant coach Asep Soemantri joined the AFC C License Coaching Course on 16–28 February in National Youth Training Center Facility, Depok.

May 
The 2015 Indonesia Super League was officially discontinued by PSSI on May 2, 2015, due to a ban by Imam Nahrawi, Minister of Youth and Sports Affairs, against PSSI to run any football competition.

Matches

Legend

Friendlies

Indonesia Super League

AFC Champions League

AFC Cup 

Notes
1.Persib Bandung's goals first.

Squad 
.

|-
|colspan="10"|Players who left the club during the 2015 season
|-

|}

Transfers

In

Out

Statistics

Appearances and goals

Goalscorers

Assists

Clean sheets

Disciplinary record

Suspended Players

References

External links 
 2015 Persib Bandung season at ligaindonesia.co.id 
 2015 Persib Bandung season at persib.co.id 
 2015 Persib Bandung season at soccerway.com

Persib Bandung
Persib Bandung
Persib Bandung seasons